Noah Leslie Hathaway (born November 13, 1971) is an American actor and a former teen idol. He is best known for his roles as Atreyu in the 1984 film The NeverEnding Story and for portraying Boxey on the original television series Battlestar Galactica.  His work in The NeverEnding Story made him particularly popular as a teen idol in Europe.

Career

Early work
Hathaway was born in Los Angeles, California. He began appearing in commercials at age three, and later starred in several TV films and  series, including an episode of Family Ties, episode 8 of season 4 called Designated Hitter. At the age of six he appeared in Battlestar Galactica, portraying Boxey, for which he received a nomination in the first Young Artist Awards.

The NeverEnding Story
He was cast as Atreyu in the 1984 film The NeverEnding Story. He received his second Young Artist Awards nomination and won the award for Best Younger Actor in the 12th Annual Saturn Awards.

For the role Hathaway performed his own stunts, leading to a few near-injuries; German director Wolfgang Petersen said: 

Hathaway observed:

Hathaway has said that, during the time he worked as a tattoo artist, he could see for himself the film's on-going popularity, as clients regularly requested tattoos of the AURYN amulet his character wore, in the film.  He claims to have given fifteen different clients AURYN amulet tattoos in three weeks.

Later roles
In 1986, Hathaway starred in Troll, as Harry Potter Jr. and in the television movie Casebusters, as Jamie. Hathaway did not return to acting until 1994, in the film To Die, to Sleep, in his first adult role. After a second hiatus as an actor, Hathaway returned in 2011 for the films Mondo Holocausto! as Ruggero Margheriti, and Sushi Girl as Fish.

In 2016, Hathaway reprised his role from The NeverEnding Story for a Spotify commercial celebrating the 1980s.

Personal life

Hathaway attended school at Lycee Français de Los Angeles. He moved into dance instruction, teaching advanced jazz and street dance until an injury forced him to quit in 1989 at age eighteen. Trained in martial arts, Hathaway would later earn black belts in Tang Soo Do and Shotokan Karate, and also competed as a Muay Thai boxer, and learned American Kenpo from Dr. Jerry Erickson. Hathaway spent some of his time at the Willow Springs Raceway in Rosamond, California competing in supersport motorcycle racing, and designing and riding "chopper" motorcycles.

He was on tour with WizardWorld Conventions and appeared at the Chicago and Philadelphia shows in 2011. He appeared at the Supanova Pop Culture Expo in Sydney, Australia in June 2012.

Filmography

Film

Television

Awards and nominations

 1980 - Young Artist Award for Best Juvenile Actor in a TV Series or Special - Nominated
 1985 - Young Artist Award for Best Young Actor in a Motion Picture - Musical, Comedy, Adventure or Drama - Nominated
 1985 - Saturn Award for Best Performance by a Younger Actor - Won
 1986 - Young Artist Award for Outstanding Young Actor - Animation Voice Over - Nominated

See also
List of former child actors from the United States

References

Bibliography 
 Holmstrom, John. The Moving Picture Boy: An International Encyclopaedia from 1895 to 1995, Norwich, Michael Russell, 1996, p. 389-390.

External links
 

1971 births
American male television actors
American male child actors
Living people
Male actors from Los Angeles
Lycée Français de Los Angeles alumni
American people of Irish descent
American people of Brazilian-Jewish descent
American people of Uruguayan-Jewish descent